Fen TV is a Bulgarian music television channel, which launched on 12 November 2003. It is owned by the company "Fen TV" Ltd., which owns Balkanika Music Television. On 12 November 2012, it started broadcasting in HD.

Television in Bulgaria
Television channels in North Macedonia
Television channels and stations established in 2003